William Arthur Callahan is a Canadian political scientist whose main research interests include China's global politics, visual international politics, documentary filmmaking, and international relations theory. Since 2013, he has been Professor of International Relations at the London School of Economics and Political Science (LSE). Callahan was Chair Professor of International Politics and China Studies at the University of Manchester (2005–2013), and Co-Director of the British Inter-University China Centre, University of Oxford.  Callahan serves as on the editorial board of Journal of Contemporary China.

Career

Callahan has been a member of:

American Political Science Association, 1990–present
Association for Asian Studies, 1990–present
British International Studies Association, 1996–present
International Studies Association, 1997–present

Publications

Monographs
Imagining Democracy: Reading "the Events of May" in Thailand (1998)
Contingent States: Greater China and Transnational Relations (2004)
Cultural Governance and Resistance in Pacific Asia (2006)
China: The Pessoptimist Nation (2012)
China Dreams: 20 Views of the Future (2015)
Pollwatching, Elections and Civil Society in Southeast Asia (2019)
Sensible Politics: Visualizing International Relations (2020)

Edited books
China Orders the World: Normative Soft Power and Foreign Policy, co-edited with Elena Barabantseva (2011)

References 

Academics of the London School of Economics
Academics of the University of Manchester
Academics of the University of Oxford
Canadian political scientists

Living people
Year of birth missing (living people)